Route 66 is a compilation album by American country band Asleep at the Wheel. Released on October 12, 1992 by Liberty Records, it contains select tracks from six of the group's first seven albums, from 1973's Comin' Right at Ya to 1979's Served Live (with the exception of 1974's Asleep at the Wheel).

Background
The release of Route 66 coincided with the 66th anniversary of the titular U.S. Route 66. The band also celebrated the anniversary with a run of shows at ten cities on the road's route in May 1992. Music website AllMusic awarded Route 66 a rating of three out of five stars.

Track listing

References

External links

Asleep at the Wheel albums
1992 compilation albums
Liberty Records compilation albums